Slavgorodsky (masculine), Slavgorodskaya (feminine), or Slavgorodskoye (neuter) is the name of several rural localities in Russia:
Slavgorodskoye, Altai Krai, a selo under the administrative jurisdiction of the town of krai significance of Slavgorod, Altai Krai
Slavgorodskoye, Belgorod Oblast, a selo in Alexeyevsky District of Belgorod Oblast